William Kearney (born 19 December 1989) is an Irish hurler who Cork Senior Championship club Sarsfields and at inter-county level with the Cork senior hurling team. He usually lines out as a right corner-back.

Early life

Kearney was born in Glanmire, County Cork. His twin brother, Daniel Kearney, also plays for Cork.

Career statistics

Club

Inter-county

Honours

University College Cork
Fitzgibbon Cup (1): 2009

Sarsfields
Cork Senior Hurling Championship (4): 2008, 2010, 2012, 2014
Cork Minor Hurling Championship (1): 2007

Cork
Munster Senior Hurling Championship (1): 2018

References

External links

William Kearney profile at the Cork GAA website

1989 births
Living people
Sarsfields (Cork) hurlers
Glanmire Gaelic footballers
UCC hurlers
Cork inter-county hurlers
Twin sportspeople
Irish twins